Wills Glasspiegel (born November 23, 1982) is an American filmmaker, artist, scholar and community organizer from Chicago. Glasspiegel has spent several years working alongside electronic musicians and dancers from Sierra Leone (bubu music), South Africa (Shangaan electro) and Chicago (Footwork (genre)). In 2017, he co-founded the arts and racial justice nonprofit, Open the Circle. He has produced public radio segments for All Things Considered and Morning Edition, and was recognized as a co-recipient of a Peabody Award in 2014 for his contributions to the public radio program Afropop Worldwide. Wills' collaborations have been featured in a variety of publications including CNN, FADER Magazine, Dazed Magazine, Pitchfork, New York Times, Wall Street Journal, The Guardian, and Chicago Tribune. He has worked since 2016 as an artist and filmmaker with The Era Footwork Crew, including as creative director for The Era's touring performance, IN THE WURKZ, a show that won the National Dance Project award in 2019 from the New England Foundation for the Arts. Glasspiegel's work has been recognized with prizes from the MacArthur Foundation, the Field Foundation, the National Endowment for the Arts, and the City of Chicago.

Public work

Film

Radio

Publications

References

American documentary filmmakers
1982 births
Living people